Andrea Minguzzi (born 1 February 1982) is an Italian Greco-Roman wrestler. He won a gold medal in the 2008 Summer Olympics.

Biography
Minguzzi was born on 1 February 1982 in Castel San Pietro Terme. His father was also a wrestler in the 1970s. He began his club career in the US Placci Bubano of Mordano. After moving to the Club Atletico CISA of Faenza, he was coached by Olympic champion Vincenzo Maenza. Since 2004 he competed under the Gruppo Sportivo Fiamme Oro, the sports group of the Polizia di Stato.

He won a team title in 2006 and 10 individual titles from 2000 to 2013 at the Italian Championships. In 2007 and 2008, Minguzzi won a bronze medal at the European Wrestling Championships.

At the 2008 Summer Olympics in Beijing, Minguzzi defeated Mélonin Noumonvi (France) in the first turn, the former Olympic Champion and current World Champion Aleksey Mishin (Russia) in the quarterfinals, Ara Abrahamian (Sweden) by controversial judging in the semifinals, and Zoltán Fodor (Hungary) in the final match. He won the gold medal and became the first Italian Olympic Champion in wrestling in 20 years after his teacher Maenza.

Abrahamian and the Swedish coach Leo Mylläri disputed the judges' ruling. Mylläri accused the judges of corruption because they initially awarded Abrahamian a point, but after the round they assigned the point and the match to Minguzzi because Abrahamian had his hand in the blue zone. Normally, having a hand in the blue zone is not penalized. Minguzzi had almost his whole body in the blue zone earlier in this match. Therefore, the Swedes demanded a video review of the match, but the referees refused to review the recording of the incidents nor consider the written Swedish protest. During the medal ceremony, Abrahamian, who won a bronze medal in the repechage, stepped off the podium and placed the medal in the center of the wrestling mat and left. Abrahamian later stated the corrupt judges had been bribed, and pointed out that the judge through marriage is related to Raphaël Martinetti, the President of FILA, the governing body of wrestling.

The next year Minguzzi won a silver medal at the June 26, 2009 at the 2009 Mediterranean Games.

He was unable to qualify to participate at the 2012 Summer Olympics.

Awards
 Order of Merit of the Italian Republic (1 September 2008, Rome)
 Golden Collar for Sporting Merit

References

External links
 
 
 
 

1982 births
Living people
People from Castel San Pietro Terme
Italian male sport wrestlers
Olympic wrestlers of Italy
Wrestlers at the 2004 Summer Olympics
Wrestlers at the 2008 Summer Olympics
Olympic gold medalists for Italy
Olympic medalists in wrestling
Medalists at the 2008 Summer Olympics
Mediterranean Games silver medalists for Italy
Competitors at the 2009 Mediterranean Games
Mediterranean Games medalists in wrestling
Wrestlers of Fiamme Oro
European Wrestling Championships medalists
Sportspeople from the Metropolitan City of Bologna